Idolatteria ops is a species of moth of the family Tortricidae. It is found in Peru.

The wingspan is about 21 mm. The ground colour of the forewings is yellow orange in the form of several spots and incomplete fasciae. The markings are blackish with a bluish gloss. The hindwings are pale orange with a dark brown base, two transverse fasciae, one costal spot, and a few smaller posterior spots.

Etymology
The species name refers to the general appearance of the species and is derived from Greek ops (meaning specimen or face).

References

Moths described in 2008
Archipini
Moths of South America
Taxa named by Józef Razowski